Eupithecia robinsoni is a moth in the family Geometridae. It is found on the Juan Fernández Islands in Chile.

References

Moths described in 2002
Endemic fauna of Chile
Geometridae of South America
robinsoni
Moths of South America